Michael Glenn Utting (born 26 May 1970, in Wellington) is a former New Zealand football player who played as a goalkeeper.

Early years
Utting grew up in Ngaio, Wellington, the youngest of four children. His father is a civil engineer, his mother a nurse; they separated when he was 10. He went to Ngaio School and then Nelson College from 1984 to 1986. He played cricket and volleyball, but football was always his number one passion. By the time he reached the final year of high school, Utting was keeping for both the Nelson College first-XI and national league side Miramar Rangers.

Club career
A much-travelled player, Utting served clubs in his native New Zealand, as well as in Australia and South Africa.

During his New Zealand years, he also played for winter clubs Gisborne City AFC and Waitakere City FC.

International career
Utting has played for the New Zealand national football team, the All Whites. Since making his debut for the All Whites in 1991, he had rarely been a substitute goalkeeper, until 1999, when his career was marred by alcoholism.

He was included in the New Zealand side for the 1999 Confederations Cup finals tournament in Mexico where he was an unused substitute. He fared better in 2003 as he was recalled for the 2003 Confederations Cup finals tournament in France, playing in all three group games before New Zealand were eliminated.

One for the Road – Utting's alcoholism
He had been into trouble with alcoholism, and his problem became public in 1999. He was axed in 1999, and again in 2002 after a botched initial attempt to quit the booze (a problem he had since 1992). He was recalled again in 2003, but by then, he had taken up a contract to play in Brunei.

References

External links
 Michael Utting Interview

 Player profile – Waitakere Utd
 Player profile – Youngheart Manawatu
 2007/2008 season stats – NZFC
 

1970 births
Living people
Association football goalkeepers
New Zealand association footballers
New Zealand international footballers
1999 FIFA Confederations Cup players
2003 FIFA Confederations Cup players
National Soccer League (Australia) players
South Melbourne FC players
Football Kingz F.C. players
SuperSport United F.C. players
Waitakere United players
People educated at Nelson College
Expatriate soccer players in South Africa
Miramar Rangers AFC players
Caroline Springs George Cross FC players
YoungHeart Manawatu players
Waikato FC players